Kel-Tec CNC Industries Inc., commonly referred to as Kel-Tec, is an American developer and manufacturer of firearms.  Founded by George Kellgren in 1991 and based in Cocoa, Florida, the company has manufactured firearms since 1995, starting with  semi-automatic pistols and expanding to rifles and then shotguns. Kel-Tec is a privately owned Florida corporation.  George Kellgren, Kel-Tec owner and chief engineer, is a Swedish designer who also designed many earlier Husqvarna, Swedish Interdynamics AB (in Sweden), Intratec and Grendel brand firearms. The company has been developing and manufacturing a wide variety of firearms, ranging from semi-automatic handguns, i.e. pistols, to semi-automatic rifles and shotguns.

History
Weapons manufactured by Kel-Tec include the  P-11 pistol (caliber 9 mm); the P-32 pistol (Caliber 32 ACP); the  P-3AT pistol (Caliber .380 ACP); the P-40 (Caliber .40 S&W)(discontinued); the SUB-9 and the later SUB-2000, both semi-automatic pistol caliber carbines that fold for storage. In addition, the company offers a family of 5.56×45mm rifles known as the SU-16 series.

November 2005 saw the introduction of the PLR-16, a long-range pistol design based on key design elements copied from the earlier SU-16 rifle design.

A new pistol design from Kel Tec in 2010, is a light weight, full-size, .22 Magnum 30 shot semiautomatic pistol, the PMR30. In 2016, Kel-Tec introduced the CMR-30 carbine, based on the PMR30.

Lightest, thinnest semi-automatic 9 mm pistol

The PF-9, a flat 9×19mm single-column magazine semi-automatic pistol based on the earlier P-11 and P-3AT designs, was upon its release touted as the thinnest and lightest 9 mm pistol ever mass-produced. It was launched in 2006.

"High-Efficiency Rifles"
At the 2007 SHOT Show held in Orlando, Florida, Kel-Tec introduced a series of new "High-Efficiency Rifles" called the RFB, standing for "Rifle, Forward-ejection, Bull-pup." The RFB is a gas-operated semi-automatic rifle with tilting breech block locking mechanism, loads the 7.62×51 NATO  cartridge and uses metric FAL magazines; the RFB "family" consists in a series of Bullpup rifles with three barrel lengths (18" barrel carbine, 24" sporter and 32" target versions), and a patented forward-ejection system via a tube placed over the barrel that ejects the spent case forwards, over the handguard of the rifle. This eliminates a major drawback of Bull-pup rifles, which is that they may not be readily usable by left-handed shooters. 
Distribution of the RFB rifles in the USA was scheduled for February 2009; as of 2013, it has been publicly released for sale. As a further Revolution of the Bullpup, the RDB (Rifle Downward-ejecting Bullpup) was released in late 2015.

Products
Kel-Tec breaks down their product line into three main categories: pistols, shotguns and rifles.

Pistols
Kel-Tec PF9
Kel-Tec P11
Kel-Tec P15
Kel-Tec P17
Kel-Tec P32
Kel-Tec P3AT 
Kel-Tec P50 
Kel-Tec PLR16
Kel-Tec PLR22
Kel-Tec PMR30
Kel-Tec CP33

Shotguns
Kel-Tec KSG
Kel-Tec KSG-25
Kel-Tec KSG Tactical
Kel-Tec KSG Compact
Kel-Tec KS7

Rifles
Kel-Tec SUB-2000
Kel-Tec SUB CQB
Kel-Tec SU-16
Kel-Tec SU-22
Kel-Tec RFB
Kel-Tec CMR-30
Kel-Tec RDB

Gallery

References

External links

Official Kel-Tec firearms site
Hi-res photos of Keltec firearms

Companies based in Brevard County, Florida
Manufacturing companies established in 1991
Firearm manufacturers of the United States
Cocoa, Florida
1991 establishments in Florida